I Am Groot is an American series of animated shorts created by Kirsten Lepore for the streaming service Disney+, based on the Marvel Comics featuring the character Groot. It features characters from the Marvel Cinematic Universe (MCU), following Baby Groot on various adventures that get him into trouble between the events of Guardians of the Galaxy (2014) and one of Guardians of the Galaxy Vol. 2 (2017) mid-credits scenes. The series is produced by Marvel Studios Animation, with Lepore serving as head writer and director.

Vin Diesel reprises his role as the voice of Baby Groot from the MCU films, with Bradley Cooper also starring. I Am Groot was announced in December 2020, and Luma Pictures began work on the series' photorealistic animation by August 2021. The involvement of Lepore was revealed that November.

I Am Groot premiered with five shorts on Disney+ on August 10, 2022, as part of Phase Four of the MCU. Five additional shorts are in development.

Premise 
Each short follows Baby Groot as he grows up in the galaxy, going on adventures with new and unusual characters that get him into trouble.

Cast and characters 
 Vin Diesel as Baby Groot:A member of the Guardians of the Galaxy who is a tree-like humanoid. Executive producer Brad Winderbaum called Baby Groot "imperfect" who "doesn't always make the right choices, but learns from his mistakes", adding it was "fun to watch him fail, and it's even more fun to watch him succeed".
 Bradley Cooper as Rocket:A member of the Guardians who is a genetically modified raccoon bounty hunter and a master of weapons and military tactics. Director Kirsten Lepore described Rocket as "bit of a scolding parent" towards Groot, but still his friend "with a soft heart", with Winderbaum stating that Rocket feels responsible for Groot as "an unlikely parent".

Additionally, James Gunn voices a wrist watch and Trevor Devall voices Iwua, a shapeshifting alien who mimics Groot.

Episodes

Production

Development 
In December 2020, Marvel Studios President Kevin Feige announced I Am Groot, a series of short films starring Baby Groot. Around then, Marvel Studios' head of streaming, television and animation Brad Winderbaum chose Kirsten Lepore to direct the shorts, which would have "little-to-no dialogue". Marvel Studios was looking for a way to return to the Baby Groot character after his appearance in Guardians of the Galaxy Vol. 2 (2017) since they felt there was "a whole universe of stories to tell" with him as a toddler. They also were drawn to early Mickey Mouse and Donald Duck short films as a way to "go back to that early Disney animation short-form style of storytelling". Lepore was announced as director of the shorts during the Disney+ Day event in November 2021; she is also the series' head writer.

I Am Groot consists of five shorts, totaling approximately 15 minutes, produced by Marvel Studios Animation. The shorts are executive produced by Marvel Studios' Feige, Louis D'Esposito, Victoria Alonso, and Winderbaum, as well as James Gunn, the writer and director of the Guardians of the Galaxy films, and Lepore. Production on five additional shorts was underway by July 2022, described as a second season. Lepore said this second collection of shorts would be "in the same spirit" as the first, and features ideas she had that did not make the first collection of shorts.

Writing 
Lepore drew inspiration from her son, and said the series uses science fiction elements to explore Groot's regular childhood moments. She met with Gunn throughout the process to ensure that she was accurately portraying Baby Groot, who Gunn described to her as a "bad baby". Lepore was also inspired by Looney Tunes as well as a Buster Keaton style of smart, physical comedy, which Feige and Winderbaum were also excited to explore. Marvel Studios was able to create animatics more easily given I Am Groot is shorts, allowing them to "play with bits and... concepts" to see what worked and find the identity of the series.

For the first short, "Groot's First Steps", Lepore wanted to explore Groot growing out of his pot, and was able to incorporate that with another idea of Groot, a sentient tree, going up against a non-sentient tree, which allowed her to explore Keaton physical comedy "in which the inanimate object always wins". "Groot's Pursuit" was conceived thinking about how children can mimic one another, resulting in one getting frustrated by it. Lepore was also interested in exploring Groot's physical abilities, which led to the short "Groot Takes a Bath". She described Groot as becoming a Chia Pet, which resulted in "a very fun arena to play in".

Gunn said the series was not necessarily connected to his Guardians of the Galaxy films, and described them as being "canon to themselves" in the Marvel Cinematic Universe (MCU). Joshua Meyer from /Film likened this to the Team Thor mockumentary shorts which he called a "funny bit of apocrypha that isn't essential to MCU continuity". Winderbaum said the shorts were set between the end of Guardians of the Galaxy Vol. 2 and that film's mid-credits scene which featured a teenage Groot, with Lepore adding that it also showed events between the end of Guardians of the Galaxy (2014) and the start of Guardians of the Galaxy Vol. 2. Gunn later stated he found it hard to see how they were "canonically MCU" despite Marvel saying they were. Other members of the Guardians of the Galaxy do not appear in the series, outside of Rocket, as the creatives were interested in focusing on Groot and "getting to know his character better" while also exploring the fun of seeing "what he does when nobody's looking" since "that's where he gets into the most trouble".

Casting 
Vin Diesel was confirmed to be reprising his role as the voice of Baby Groot in June 2022. Diesel recorded new lines for the shorts, after it was initially discussed to reuse existing recordings of him saying "I am Groot" for the series. The next month, Bradley Cooper was revealed to be reprising his MCU role as the voice of Rocket, as well as Gunn voicing a wrist watch. Trevor Devall voices Iwua. Bob Bergen, Terri Douglas, Scott Menville, Kaitlyn Robrock, Fred Tatasciore, Kari Wahlgren, and Matthew Wood provide additional voices.

Design 
Baby Groot is the same model designed by Luma Pictures for Vol. 2. Lepore enjoyed designing the Grunds, seen in "Little Guys", and finding the way to make them be expressive with "just black dots and a mouth". Other original designs for the series included Iwua, the shapeshifting alien, and Snoot Pin Bongo, a squirrel-like creature inspired by the Star Wars character Salacious Crumb. Perception created the titles for I Am Groot. The series presents the Marvel Studios opening and fanfare fast-forwarding. Lepore was looking to get "really irreverent" with the opening, with Winderbaum adding the studio was always looking for ways to shorten the opening. The creatives liked this since it helped balance the runtime of the shorts without having "a minute-and-a-half opening" along with "a five-minute credit sequence", with Lepore calling it the perfect design for Groot.

Animation and editing 
Work on the series' photorealistic animation style began by August 2021. Winderbaum explained that Marvel Studios wanted I Am Groot to feel "directly rooted in the language of the films", which is why they chose visual effects company Luma Pictures to animate the series since they previously designed and worked on Baby Groot for Vol. 2. Winderbaum highlighted how Lepore's experience working with stop motion animation translated to her directing computer-generated animation. When talking to Lepore, Gunn compared Baby Groot's poses and facial expressions to emojis due the character's face just having eyes and a mouth.

Initial conceptions of the episodes in the storyboard and animatic stages resulted in the shorts being about five minutes. Lepore was aiming for each short to be approximately three minutes in length, and made refinements and "edited very carefully" to get them to that runtime.

Music 
Daniele Luppi served as the composer for the first five shorts of I Am Groot. Lepore chose Luppi to score the series given his past work with an electronic sound, which helped translate to the "strange" sound she was looking for. She added that his score "sounds like it came out of a Spaghetti Western with the same kind of patina on it from that era". Luppi used old microphones, keyboards, and other analog instruments to give his score an "authentic, more organic sound". A single featuring the songs "Groot Bossa Nova" and "Groot Tuttifrutti" from the shorts was released digitally by Marvel Music and Hollywood Records on August 4, 2022.

Lepore wanted to feature music from the 1960s and 1970s, and looked at music from around the world instead of just the United States, to differ it from the music featured in the Guardians of the Galaxy films. Licensed songs in the series include "In the Hall of the Mountain Queen" by Raymond Scott in "Groot's First Steps", which Lepore noted instantly gives the short a "really weird flavor, this spacey, early electro feel", "Ran Kan Kan" by Tito Puente in "Groot's Pursuit", and "You Can Get It If You Really Want" by Jimmy Cliff in "Magnum Opus".

Marketing 
Brief footage from the series was shown during Disney's annual meeting of shareholders in March 2022 within a content highlight reel. The first poster for the series, announcing its release date, was revealed on June 5, which made the series "immediately [begin] trending online". According to Variety Trending TV chart, it amassed 231,000 user engagements, which measure the combination of tweets, retweets, likes, and hashtags, the second most for the week of May 30 to June 5, behind the Netflix series Stranger Things. Marvel Studios partnered with Wonderful Pistachios and Framestore for a "Groot Gets Crackin'" marketing campaign, featuring Groot across television advertisements, digital and social media posts, and limited-edition packaging for their pistachios, as well as in-store displays until August 31. A 15-second television spot was released on June 6, as part of the campaign. Tickets to attend Marvel's Avengers S.T.A.T.I.O.N. in Las Vegas were also set to be given out randomly to customers who bought their pistachios as part of the campaign.

The short "Magnum Opus" debuted at the El Capitan Theatre, appearing before select screenings of the MCU film Thor: Love and Thunder (2022), from July 18 to 24. The short "Groot Takes a Bath" was shown during Marvel Studios' animation panel at San Diego Comic-Con on July 22, where Lepore discussed the series and a trailer for all of the shorts was also released. Posters for each short were released ahead of their premiere.

Release 
I Am Groot premiered with five shorts on Disney+ on August 10, 2022, as part of Phase Four of the MCU.

Reception

Audience viewership 
I Am Groot was the third highest streaming series for viewers in the United States for the week ending August 14, 2022, according to Whip Media's TV Time.

Critical response 
The review aggregator website Rotten Tomatoes reported an 87% approval rating, with an average score of 7.70/10, based on 15 reviews. The website's critics consensus reads: "He is Groot, and that novelty alone ought to give MCU fans a rooting interest in this slight but fun series of hijinks."

Matt Fowler of IGN gave I Am Groot 7 out of 10, finding the shorts "adorable as an animated offshoot of the MCU but also contain a quirky dark humor thanks to [Baby] Groot's own temper and penchant for getting punchy." Fowler noted how Groot's prickliness was "a saving grace... as these types of shorts rarely showcase a brat." Andrew Webster of The Verge considered the series as one of the greatest animated shorts on Disney+, feeling the shorts were "fun and goofy". Webster also found that the short runtime "works well here — the gimmick doesn't last long enough to overstay its welcome." Varietys Wilson Chapman said I Am Groot was "charming, briskly paced and — in a rarity for a Marvel streaming TV show — completely self-contained, with no cameos or set-ups for another show to speak-of". Brett White from Decider likened the series to Looney Tunes with "mayhem in the best way possible" and called I Am Groot "a damn  from beginning to end", saying, "Each short zips along at a perfect pace, deploying sight gags that hit their mark every time." White was frustrated, however, with each short being their own entry on Disney+ rather than collected under one title. Nick Schager at The Daily Beast was positive on the shorts, saying their "brevity prevents it from growing stale, and yet given that each chapter runs only four minutes, a little extra time might have let it playfully elaborate upon its conceits". He also enjoyed the animation, saying I Am Groot "boasts a handsome vibrancy and level of detail".

References

External links 
  at Marvel.com
 

2020s American animated television series
2020s American comic science fiction television series
2020s American children's comedy television series
2022 American television series debuts
American children's animated comic science fiction television series
American children's animated superhero television series
American computer-animated television series
Animated television series based on Marvel Comics
Disney short film series
Disney+ original programming
English-language television shows
Guardians of the Galaxy (film series)
Marvel Cinematic Universe shorts
Marvel Cinematic Universe: Phase Four mass media
Television series by Marvel Studios
Television shows based on Marvel Comics
Television shows based on works by Jack Kirby
Television shows based on works by Stan Lee
Works by James Gunn